A Race of Noblemen (Spanish:Raza de hidalgos) is a 1927 Spanish silent film directed by and starring Tony D'Algy. It was shot at the Berlin studios of UFA as part of a co-production agreement.

Cast
 Helena D'Algy 
 Tony D'Algy 
 Mercedes Jares 
 José Nieto

References

Bibliography
 Labanyi, Jo & Pavlović, Tatjana. A Companion to Spanish Cinema. John Wiley & Sons, 2012.

External links 

1927 films
Spanish silent films
1920s Spanish-language films
Spanish black-and-white films